Spain participated in the eighth Winter Paralympics in Salt Lake City, United States.

See also
2002 Winter Paralympics
Spain at the 2002 Winter Olympics

External links
International Paralympic Committee
Comité Paralímpico Español

2002
Nations at the 2002 Winter Paralympics
Paralympics